Mount Tom is a rural locality in the Gladstone Region, Queensland, Australia.

References 

Gladstone Region
Localities in Queensland